The Interton Video 3000 is a dedicated first-generation home video game console that was released in Germany in 1976 by German manufacturer Interton and sold by Quelle. Due to the AY-3-8500 chipset from General Instrument, the console has six integrated games: Tennis (Pong clone), Football, Practice, Squash, Skeet and Moving target. It had a list price of 198 Deutsche Mark (DM).

Club Exclusiv 2000 
In 1977, a special variant of the Interton Video 3000, called Club Exclusiv 2000, was released only in Germany. However, it did not show any Interton brand on the console. It was made by Interton and did not use a cartridge system like the Video 2000, instead it offered the same games as the Video 3000 but came with a set of remote controls with no controls built inside the main unit. For the Video 3000 you had to buy these remote controls (called Accessory V350) separately. The Club 2000 is a very rare collector's item today, as it is one of the very few blue Pong consoles worldwide.

References 

First-generation video game consoles
Dedicated consoles
1970s toys
Video games developed in Germany